Kalateh-ye Allah Nazar (also Romanized as Kalāteh-ye Āllāh Naz̧ar) is a village in Khangiran Rural District, in the Central District of Sarakhs County, Razavi Khorasan Province, Iran. At the 2006 census, its population was 947, in 211 families.

References 

Populated places in Sarakhs County